"Planet Earth" is a song by Australian rock band, Eskimo Joe. It was released in November 2001 as the third single from their debut studio album, Girl. 

"Planet Earth" peaked at No. 41 on the Western Australian singles chart and No.31 on Triple J's Hottest 100 for 2001.

Track listing

Release history

References

Eskimo Joe songs
2001 singles
Song recordings produced by Ed Buller
2000 songs
Modular Recordings singles
Songs written by Stuart MacLeod (musician)
Songs written by Joel Quartermain
Songs written by Kavyen Temperley